{{Infobox concert
| image           = 
| image_caption   = Promotional poster for the tour
| image_size      = 
| border          = yes
| artist          = Helene Fischer
| album           = Farbenspiel
| start_date      = 
| end_date        = 
| number_of_legs  = 2
| number_of_shows = 
| gross     = 
| last_tour = 
| this_tour = Farbenspiel Live(2014-15)
| next_tour = Helene Fischer Live 2017/2018(2017-18)
}}Farbenspiel Live' was a European concert tour by German singer Helene Fischer, in support of her sixth studio album, Farbenspiel''. It began on 25 September 2014, in Riesa, Germany at the Erdgas Arena, continued throughout Europe, and finally concluded on 8 July 2015 in Dresden at Glücksgas Stadium. The tour visited arenas and stadiums throughout 2014 and 2015. The concerts in Berlin in July 2015 were recorded for an Official Live DVD which was released on 4 September 2015.
The 2015 part of the Tour was ranked as the 38th biggest International Tour of the year with earnings of about $42,000,000. Fischer is also the most successful German Act on the list for the second year in a row.

Set list
{{hidden
| headercss = background: #FFE6FF; font-size: 100%; width: 90%;
| contentcss = text-align: left; font-size: 100%; width: 90%;
| header = 2014 - Die Tournee
| content = 
This set list is representative of the performance in Frankfurt. It does not represent all concerts for the duration of the 2014 tour.
 "Intro"
 "Unser Tag"
 "Und morgen früh küss' ich dich wach"
 "Fehlerfrei"
 "Mitten im Paradies"
 "In diesen Nächten"
 "Wunder dich nicht"
 "Nur wer den Wahnsinn liebt"
 "Interlude Winter"
 "Lass jetzt los (Let it Go)"
 "Vergeben, vergessen und wieder vertrau'n"
 "Bring Me to Life" (Evanescence cover) 
 "Feuerwerk"
 "Rock Medley" (You're the Voice / I Love Rock 'n' Roll / Jump / Livin' on a Prayer / Purple Rain)
 "Mit keinem Andern"
 "Interlude Frühling"
 "Der Augenblick"
 "Caruso" (Lucio Dalla cover)
 "Ein kleines Glück"
 "Interlude Sommer"
 "Marathon"
 "Ich habe Fieber / Fever" (Peggy Lee cover)
 "Ich will immer wieder dieses Fieber spüren"
 "Te quiero"
 "Fly" (Céline Dion cover)
 "My Heart Will Go On" (Céline Dion cover)
 "Von hier bis unendlich"
 "Die Hölle morgen früh"
Encore
  "Phänomen"
  "Atemlos durch die Nacht"
}}

{{hidden
| headercss = background: #FFE6FF; font-size: 100%; width: 90%;
| contentcss = text-align: left; font-size: 100%; width: 90%;
| header = 2015 - Die Stadion-Tournee
| content = 
This set list is representative of the performance in Hamburg. It does not represent all concerts for the duration of the 2015 tour.
 "Intro"
 "Unser Tag"
 "Und morgen früh küss' ich dich wach"
 "Fehlerfrei"
 "Mitten im Paradies"
 "Wunder dich nicht"
 "Marathon"
 "Te quiero"
 "Interlude Winter"
 "Ich wollte nie erwachsen sein (Nessaja's Lied)" (Peter Maffay cover)
 "Vergeben, vergessen und wieder vertrau'n"
 "Feuerwerk"
 "Party Medley" (Party Rock Anthem / Seven Nation Army / Sexy / Männer / Sex on fire / The Best)
 "Mit keinem Andern"
 "Interlude Sommer"
 "So kann das Leben sein"
 "Everything I Do" (Bryan Adams cover)
 "Ich habe Fieber / Fever" (Peggy Lee cover)
 "Ich will immer wieder dieses Fieber spüren"
 "Von hier bis unendlich"
 "Ein kleines Glück"
 "The Rose" (Bette Midler cover)
 "Hundert Prozent"
 "Die Hölle morgen früh"
Encore
  "Phänomen"
  "Atemlos durch die Nacht"
}}

Shows

References 

2015 concert tours
Concert tours of Europe